Aguinaldo Filho is a Brazilian actor, narrator, journalist, TV anchor, translator and radio personality.

Early life
Filho was one of five children born in Jaragua do Sul, in Santa Catarina, Brazil, to Aguinaldo José de Souza and Abigail Melchiades de Souza. As a child, he would often stay up late at night to listen to the radio. At age 14, he took a correspondence course in broadcasting. After fulfilling his mandatory military service at 19, Filho moved to Rio de Janeiro to be with his parents.

Career
One evening, while listening to a local radio announcer stumbling over his words, Filho decided he could do better. The next day, he auditioned for three radio stations, two of which (Mayrink Veiga and Radio Relógio) made him offers. Filho started work as an announcer the next day. Filho then enrolled in the Fundação Brasileira de Teatro drama school, studying to be an actor.  He began dubbing films for television and performing small parts for various film productions and TV soap operas. 

He applied for work as an international broadcaster for Voice of America. Upon hearing he had been hired, Filho quit his jobs and proposed to his girlfriend, but the offer was later withdrawn for lack of experience. When Filho explained his situation to Voice of America representative Lilian Lamachia, she arranged for him to work at the American Embassy's recording studio in Rio, a job he held for three years. Still eager to travel abroad, Filho became an International Broadcaster for Radio Sweden and arrived in Stockholm in March 1966.

A year later, Filho left his job at Radio Sweden and attempted to study drama at RADA in London, but was denied entrance due to lack of funds.  He spent a year hitchhiking Europe, and in July 1967, he was rewarded a scholarship from the Gulbenkin Foundation to study linguists and philology at the Faculty of Letters in Lisbon, Portugal. Upon completion of his studies, he spent a year in Czechoslovakia as an International Broadcaster for Radio Prague. During this period, Filho frequently traveled to London to work as a Portuguese professor and to do voiceover work for the British Broadcasting Company (BBC). When the Soviet Union invaded Czechoslovakia, Filho and his wife moved to London. 

In 1972, he was offered a position at NHK Radio in Japan. While in New York City en route to Japan, his offer was once again withdrawn.  Filho and his wife chose to stay in New York, where Filho spent a year as an office clerk at the Brazilian Trade Bureau. He then contacted Lilian LaMachia at Voice Of America and informed her that he was in America. She hired him six months later and he spent the next 15 years working the night shift for VOA in Washington DC. During this time, Filho anchored news broadcasts, wrote cultural programs, broadcast the launching of several shuttles to outer space, and covered the first visit of the Pope to the USA. He also reported for Brazilian Radio Capital and was the Portuguese voice of televangelists Rex Humbard, Ben Kinchlow, and Morris Cerullo.

In 1987, Filho quit VOA, and decided to study at Brooks Institute of Photography in Santa Barbara, California, graduating in 1990 with a BA in Media and Cinematography. Filho and his third wife Rosa moved to Los Angeles, where Filho taught traffic school while searching for a job as a cinematographer. One year later, Filho read in Variety that Ted Turner was opening the international TNT Network to South America. Filho offered his expertise and was hired on the spot. During his time at TNT, Filho produced various promos, corporate videos and radio spots. He also performed simultaneous translation for live television broadcasts. 

In 2000, Filho became an anchorman at PanAmerica Sports Network in Miami, Florida. The network went bankrupt two years later and, after an unsuccessful attempt at operating a TCBY franchise at Hollywood Beach, Filho and his family returned to Brazil, settling in Florianópolis, where they have remained since. Filho continues to work as an actor, voice artist, and narrator of audio books.

Personal life
In the early 1960s, he met one of his fans, Maria das Dores de Souza, and they had their only child, Katia Cristina, in 1962. They separated three years later. 

Ficho met his second wife Misha on the first day of work at Radio Prague. Their son Phillip was born in London. They divorced in 1987. 

In 1990, while visiting Washington DC for a niece's wedding, he proposed to his current wife Rosa DeSouza five days after meeting her.

References

External links
 
 http://voice123.com/aguinaldojosedesouzafilho
 http://radialist.as/profile/AguinaldoJosedeSouzaFilho#axzz27nXx2184

Year of birth missing (living people)
Living people
People from Santa Catarina (state)
Brazilian male actors
Brazilian radio personalities
Brazilian television presenters